Guisinol is an antibacterial depside with the molecular formula C23H25ClO5 that has been isolated from the fungus Aspergillus unguis.

References

Further reading 

 

Chloroarenes
Antibiotics